The Temple of Luna (Latin: templum or aedes Lunae) was a temple on the Aventine Hill in Rome, dedicated to Luna, the moon goddess. Its dedication was celebrated on 31 March.

According to Tacitus, it was built by king Servius Tullius. However, the first confirmed reference to a temple to Luna dates to 182 BC and refers to one of its doors being knocked off its posts by a miraculous blast of air and shot into the back of the Temple of Ceres. That account probably places the temple at the north end of the hill, just above porta Trigemina. The temple was struck by lightning around the time of the death of Cinna, as was the temple of Ceres. After the destruction of Corinth, Lucius Mummius Achaicus dedicated some of his spoils from the city to this temple. It was destroyed in the Great Fire of Rome in 64 AD and not rebuilt.

See also
List of Ancient Roman temples

Sources
Samuel Ball Platner, Aedes Lunae, in A Topographical Dictionary of Ancient Rome, London, Oxford University Press, 1929, p. 320

References

2nd-century BC establishments in the Roman Republic
60s disestablishments in the Roman Empire
64 disestablishments
2nd-century BC religious buildings and structures
Buildings and structures demolished in the 1st century
Luna
Moon temples
Roman temples by deity
Burned buildings and structures
Luna (goddess)